is a judoka who represented the Philippines at the World Judo Championships, the Southeast Asian Games, and the Olympic Games.

He was born in Japan to a Japanese father and Filipina mother.

Early life
Hoshina was born and raised in Shizuoka, Japan to a Filipina mother and Japanese father. He started competing in judo before the age of 10 - his father is a judo fanatic and encouraged him to enter tournaments.

He continued competing in judo while at college and he hopes eventually to become a sumo wrestling teacher.

Career

2012 Summer Olympics

In 2012 Summer Olympics in London, Hoshina debuted in the Men's +100 kg in judo, representing the Philippines.

On August 3, 2012, in the pool round, Hoshina was drawn against Kim Sung-Min of South Korea who had previously beaten him at the 2011 World Judo Championships and the 2011 Asian Judo Championships. Hoshina did not progress to the next round, again losing to Kim due to Kim's full-point throw, an ippon. The game was timed out in 1 minute and 5 seconds ending with Kim scoring 100 to Hoshina's 0.

References

1987 births
Living people
Olympic judoka of the Philippines
Filipino male judoka
People from Bulacan
People from Shizuoka (city)
Judoka at the 2012 Summer Olympics
Japanese people of Filipino descent
Filipino people of Japanese descent
Sportspeople from Shizuoka Prefecture
Judoka at the 2006 Asian Games
Judoka at the 2010 Asian Games
Southeast Asian Games medalists in judo
Southeast Asian Games silver medalists for the Philippines
Competitors at the 2007 Southeast Asian Games
Asian Games competitors for Japan